Deshapathi Srinivas (born 1970) is an Indian lyricist, singer and Officer on Special Duty (OSD) to Chief Minister, Government of Telangana. He is one of the key leaders of Telangana Separation Movement. His songs are eloquent. He is an advocate for the separation of Telangana. He takes an active role in Government of Telangana, Telugu language promotion.

Early life
He was born in a village in Siddipet, Medak district, Telangana to Gopalakrisha and Bala Saraswati. His father use to write poems in Telugu and Urdu. He did his graduation in Medak.

Career
Deshapati Srinivas was a school teacher. He travels to all major public meetings and rallies organised for Telangana Separation. He is often invited to Television talk shows to discuss Telangana Movement.

His lyrics are sometimes used in movies. He is famous for singing popular Telangana song, Nageti sallala na Telangana, which was written by Nandini Sidda Reddy.

References

Living people
Activists from Telangana
Indian male folk singers
Telugu-language lyricists
Telangana movement
1967 births